Koray Altınay (born 11 October 1991) is a Turkish footballer who plays as a right back or defensive midfielder for TFF First League club Çaykur Rizespor.

Career

Koray Altınay began his career with SC Fürstenfeldbruck before joining Bayern Munich II in 2011. He made eleven appearances for the Bayern Munich reserve team in the 2011–12 season, scoring one goal, the winner in a 1–0 victory in the mini-Munich derby against TSV 1860 München II. At the end of the season he signed for Jahn Regensburg of the 2. Bundesliga, and made his debut at this level in November 2012 as a substitute for Christian Rahn in a 3–3 draw with 1. FC Union Berlin. After Jahn were relegated from the 2. Bundesliga, Koray Altınay joined Çaykur Rizespor in July 2013.

Honours
Sivasspor
 Turkish Cup: 2021–22

References

External links

 
 

1991 births
Living people
Footballers from Munich
Turkish footballers
Turkey B international footballers
German people of Turkish descent
German footballers
FC Bayern Munich II players
SSV Jahn Regensburg players
Çaykur Rizespor footballers
Ankaraspor footballers
Fatih Karagümrük S.K. footballers
Sivasspor footballers
2. Bundesliga players
Regionalliga players
Süper Lig players
TFF First League players
Association football defenders